Suren Tigrani Yeremian (– 17 December 1992) was a Soviet and Armenian historian and cartographer who specialized in the study of the early formation of the Armenian nation, pre-medieval Armenia, and the Caucasus. He devoted nearly thirty years of his scholarly efforts in reconstructing the Ashkharhatsuyts, a seventh-century atlas commonly attributed to Anania Shirakatsi.

Biography

Early life and education
Yeremian was born into a family of laborers in Tiflis, in 1908 and attended a local Russian school. Yeremian was an avid reader of history books and his interest in Armenian history grew especially when he read Nicholas Adontz's Armenia in the Period of Justinian. He moved to Armenia and in 1928, he was accepted to Yerevan State University.

He studied history and economics and graduated from there in 1931. From 1935 until 1941, Yeremian worked at the Academy of Sciences of the Soviet Union's department of Oriental studies in Leningrad. While there, Yeremian also taught Armenian history at Leningrad State University's Department of History and Philology. He defended his dissertation, titled "The Feudal Organization of Kartli during the Marzpanate Period."

In 1941, he moved back to Yerevan and continued his studies at the Institute of Material Culture and History, which was still under the auspices of the Soviet Academy of Sciences. He earned the title of professor in 1953, having defended his second dissertation (from Moscow State University), titled "The Social Structure of Ancient Armenia." He held the position of director of the department of history from 1953 to 1958 and in 1963 he was inducted as a member of the Armenian National Academy of Sciences.

Academic research
It was during this time that Yeremian shifted his focus to composing historical atlases: one of his most notable contributions was on the study of a seventh-century Ashkharatsuyts, where he spent a great deal of his energies in not only translating and researching the background behind the atlas but also on the supposed author of the work, Anania Shirakatsi. In 1963, his Armenia According to the Ashkharatsuyts was published, although Yeremian would in subsequent years go on to revise some of the views, most notably coming to the conclusion that Anania Shirakatsi was its true author, that he had concluded in the work. He also contributed in writing several articles in the USSR Historical Atlas. Yeremian was also one of the key advocates who pushed for the publication of the History of the Armenian People (Yerevan, 1971–1984, 8 volumes), authoring numerous articles on the origins of the Armenian people, the kingdom of Urartu, and on the social, economic, cultural and political structure of the Kingdom of Armenia. He would also go on to write numerous articles in the Armenian Soviet Encyclopedia.

He struggled with a serious illness for many years, and died in 1992.

Selected works
 Hayastane ust "Ashkharhatsuytsi". Yerevan, 1963.

Notes

1908 births
1992 deaths
Writers from Tbilisi
Academic staff of Saint Petersburg State University
Yerevan State University alumni
Academic staff of Yerevan State University
Recipients of the Order of the Red Banner of Labour
Armenian cartographers
20th-century Armenian historians
Soviet cartographers
Soviet historians
20th-century cartographers